Thorvald Andersen (8 April 1883 - 3 May 1935 ) was a Danish architect. He contributed to Rigshospitalet in Copenhagen in the 1920s.

Family 
Carl Christian Thorvald Andersen was born in the parish of  Årup on the island of Funen in Assens Municipality, Denmark.  He is the son of Hans Ditlev Andersen and Petra Vilhelmine Johanne Louise Andersen. 
He attended Odense Technical School, with a graduation in 1903; He was admitted to the Royal Danish Academy of Fine Arts in  1904 and left in 1910. 
He worked from 1907 to 1912 with Martin Borch (1852-1937) at Rigshospitalet which, starting in 1910, was relocated to its present location consisting of buildings surrounding a central garden. He worked for a number of years from 1912 with  Kristoffer Varming (1865-1936).

He was the supervisory architect and consultant for the Ministry of Justice buildings.

He died in 1975 in the Frederiksberg district of Copenhagen and was interred at Søndermark Cemetery.

See also
List of Danish architects

References

1883 births
1935 deaths
People from Assens Municipality
Danish architects
Royal Danish Academy of Fine Arts alumni